The  (formerly known as the  prior to 17 March 2018) is a "Romancecar" limited express train operated by Odakyu Electric Railway between  and  via the Odakyu Odawara Line and JR Central's Gotemba Line.

Route
Mt. Fuji services stop at the following stations:

 –  –  –  –  –  – – 

 The outbound Mt. Fuji No. 1 and No. 3 travel to Gotemba, and the inbound Mt. Fuji No. 6 travels to Shinjuku at the evening stop at Suruga-Oyama. When boarding a Mt. Fuji train at Suruga-Oyama, a limited express ticket must be purchased from onboard train crew.

Rolling stock
 Odakyu 60000 series MSE 6-car EMUs (since 17 March 2012)

Past
  and  DMUs (July 1959 – June 1968)
 Odakyu 3000 series SSE EMUs (July 1968 – March 1991)
 JR Central 371 series 7-car EMU (March 1991 – 16 March 2012)
 Odakyu 20000 series RSE 7-car EMUs (March 1991 – 16 March 2012)

History

Kyushu Asagiri
This service was upgraded to "Express" status from 5 March 1966. It was discontinued from 1 October 1980.

Gotemba Line Asagiri
Asagiri services were upgraded to "express" status from 1 July 1968 following electrification and the introduction of Odakyu 3000 series SE EMUs. The four names were also merged into "" in hiragana. It became a "Limited express" from 16 March 1991 with the introduction of new JR Central 371 series and Odakyu 20000 series RSE 7-car EMUs, operating between Shinjuku and Numazu.

March 2012 timetable revision
From the start of the revised timetable on 17 March 2012, the Odakyu 20000 series sets and JR Central's lone 371 series set were withdrawn, and all services were operated instead using Odakyu 60000 series MSE 6-car sets. From the same date, service frequency was reduced from the current four return services daily to three on weekdays and four at weekends, and all services were truncated to operate between Shinjuku and Gotemba stations.

March 2018 timetable revision 
From the start of the revised timetable on 17 March 2018, Asagiri services are renamed .

References

External links

 Odakyu Limited Express Romancecar information
  

Named passenger trains of Japan
Central Japan Railway Company
Odakyu Electric Railway
Railway services introduced in 1959
1959 establishments in Japan